Sirkka-Liisa Konttinen (born 1948) is a Finnish photographer who has worked in Britain since the 1960s. Her work is held in the collections of the Museum of Fine Arts, Houston, National Gallery of Art, Washington, D.C., Tate and the UK Memory of the World Register.

Life and work

Konttinen was born in Myllykoski, municipality of Sippola (from 1975 part of the town of Anjalankoski, from 2009 part of the town of Kouvola), Finland in 1948. Konttinen became interested in photography at the age of 12 and was a member of a photography group in a nearby town. Intending to pursue photography as a career, she was apprenticed to a fashion photographer in Helsinki for a year. Konttinen studied photography in London in the 1960s, and cofounded the Amber collective, which moved to the northeast of England in 1969.

From 1969 Konttinen lived in Byker, and for about a decade photographed and interviewed the residents of this area of terraced houses until her own house was demolished. She continued to work there for some time afterwards. This resulted in the book Byker, which in David Alan Mellor's words "bore witness to her intimate embeddedness in the locality". In 1980 she became the first photographer since the Cultural Revolution to have her work exhibited by the British Council in China.

Konttinen's next project was a study of girls attending dance schools in North Shields, their mothers, and the schools. The book Step by Step came from this. The book was an influence for the film Billy Elliot.

Three years of photographing the beach between Seaham and Hartlepool resulted in the series "Coal Coast".

Konttinen later returned to Byker and photographed its new residents in colour.

Publications
Byker. London: Jonathan Cape, 1983. . Newcastle: Bloodaxe, 1985. . Stockport: Dewi Lewis, 2022. .
Step by Step. Newcastle: Bloodaxe, 1989. .
Writing in the Sand: On the Beaches of North East England. Stockport: Dewi Lewis, 2001. .
Écrit dans le sable: sur les plages du Nord-Est de l'Angleterre. Paris: Schultz, 2000. . 
Skrivet i sanden: på sandstränderna i nordöstra England. Stockholm: Schultz Forlag, 2000. . 
Hiekkaan kirjoitettu: Koillis-Englannin rannoilla. Oulu: Kustantamo Pohjoinen, 2000. . 
The Coal Coast. Newcastle: Amberside, 2003. .
Byker Revisited. Newcastle: Northumberland University Press, 2009. .
Thomas Kennedy. Sirkka-Liisa Konttinen. Tate Photography. London: Tate, 2022. .

Exhibitions
Documents of the North East (with Graham Smith, James Cleet, and Robert Carling), Side Gallery, Newcastle, 1977
Photographs from the Beaches (with Markéta Luskačová), Side Gallery, Newcastle, 1978
North Tyneside (with Isabella Jedrzejczyk, Markéta Luskačová and Graham Smith), Side Gallery, Newcastle, 1981
Byker, Side Gallery, Newcastle, 1983
Cedarwood Woman, Side Gallery, Newcastle, 1988
Step by Step, Side Gallery, Newcastle, 1989; touring, 1990, 1992
The Writing in the Sand, Side Gallery, Newcastle, 1991; touring 1993
Dream On (with Steve Conlan and Richard Grassick), Side Gallery, Newcastle, 1992
My Finnish Roots, Side Gallery, Newcastle and touring, 1993, 1994
Quayside (with Graham Smith), Side Gallery, Newcastle and touring, 1993
Writing in the Sand, Side Gallery, Newcastle, 2000
Coalfield Stories (with Dean Chapman, John Davies, Martin Figura, Peter Fryer, Richard Grassick, Sally-Ann Norman, Keth Pattison, Bruce Rae, Chris Steele-Perkins), Side Gallery, Newcastle, 2002/3
Coal Coast, Baltic Centre for Contemporary Art, Gateshead, 2003
Coalfield Stories (with John Davies and Simon Norfolk), Photofusion, London, 2005/6
Byker Revisited, Side Gallery, Newcastle, 2009
Byker, L. Parker Stephenson Photographs, New York, 2013
Step by Step, L. Parker Stephenson Photographs, New York City, 2017
Living Cities (with Kader Attia, Mark Bradford, Julie Mehretu, Boris Mikhailov, Marwan Rechmaoui, and Nil Yalter), Tate Modern, London, 2017. Included 17 photographs by Konttinen.
Women by Women exhibition curated by Konttinen as part of Idea of North exhibition, Baltic Centre for Contemporary Art, Gateshead, UK, 2018

Awards
Grand Prix at the Melbourne International Film Festival (1992) for the film The Writing in the Sand.
Prix du Documentaire, Cinéma du Réel, Paris (1992) for the film The Writing in the Sand

Collections
Konttinen's work is held in the following permanent collections:
Museum of Fine Arts, Houston: 1 print (as of 6 November 2022)
National Gallery of Art, Washington, D.C.: 3 prints (as of 6 November 2022)
Tate, UK: 24 prints (as of 6 November 2022)
UK Memory of the World Register: Konttinen's photography of the northeast of England from 1969 to 2009, and Amber's related films

Notes

References

Living people
1948 births
Photographers from Northumberland
Finnish photographers
Finnish expatriates in the United Kingdom
Artists from Newcastle upon Tyne
People from Kouvola
Finnish women photographers